Xenacanthida (or Xenacanthiforms) is a super-order of extinct shark-like elasmobranchs known from the Carboniferous to Triassic. They were native to freshwater, marginal marine and shallow marine habitats. Most forms had large serrated spines extending backwards from the neck. Most xenacanths died out at the end of the Permian in the Permian Mass Extinction, with only a few forms surviving into the Triassic.

Description 
The foundation of the tooth is prolonged lingually with a circlet button and a basal tubercle on the oral and aboral surfaces individually. Xenacanthida's teeth are famed by articulated bones, cephalic vertebrae and isolated teeth and found global in each aquatic and clean environment. The family Xenacanthidae consist of five genera that are Xenacanthus, Triodus, Plicatodus, Mooreodontus and Wurdigneria; all of these are distinguished by cross sections of the points, crown center, length of the median edge, type of vertical cristae, and microscopic anatomy. These kinds of fishes are largely marked from Paleozoic remains and their diversity cut drastically throughout the period of their extinction.

Xenacanths are divided into two groups based on dental characteristics. Group one has tricuspid crown containing two stout, slightly diverging lateral cusps pointing in the same direction, a high median cusp, with a crown-base angle almost at 90 degrees, a large, rounded, apical button with several foramina and multiple, 8-9 coarse vertical cristae on all the cusps. Group two has bicuspid crowns with two upright, asymmetric cusps, where the medial cusp is thicker than the distal one, and consistently lacks a median cusp.

Xenacanths had long dorsal fins, as well as a large spine projecting from the top of the head, which was a modified dorsal-fin spine. The spine is usually thought to have acted as a defense against attackers.

Ecology 
Based on isotope analysis of teeth, some xenacanths are likely to have lived permanently in freshwater environments. The diet of freshwater xenacanths is known to have included temnospondyls as well as palaeoniscid fish. In the Early Permian freshwater lakes of the Saar–Nahe Basin in southern Germany, large xenacanths are suggested to have acted as the apex predators of this ecosystem.

Taxonomy

 Order: Bransonelliformes Hampe & Ivanov, 2007
 Genus: Barbclabornia Johnson, 2003
 Genus: Bransonella Harlton, 1933
 Order: Xenacanthiformes Berg, 1955
 Family: Diplodoselachidae Dick, 1981
 Genus: Diplodoselache Dick, 1981
 Genus: Dicentrodus Traquair, 1888
 Genus: Hagenoselache Hampe & Heidkte, 1997
 Genus: Hokomata Hodnett & Elliott, 2018
 Genus: Lebachacanthus Soler-Gijon, 1997
 Genus: Reginaselache Turner & Burrow, 2011
 Family: Sphenacanthidae Heyler & Poplin 1989
 Genus: Sphenacanthus Agassiz, 1837
 Genus: Xenosynechodus Agassiz, 1980
 Family: Orthacanthidae Heyler & Poplin 1989
 Genus: Orthacanthus Agassiz, 1843
 Family: Xenacanthidae Fritsch, 1889
 Genus: Mooreodontus Ginter et al., 2010
 Genus: Plicatodus Hampe, 1995
 Genus: Triodus Jordan, 1849
 Genus: Xenacanthus Beyrich, 1848
 Genus: Wurdigneria Richter, 2005
 incertae sedis
 Genus: Anodontacanthus Davis, 1881
 Genus: Tikiodontus Bhat, Ray & Datta, 2018

References

Further reading

Prehistoric cartilaginous fish orders
Carboniferous sharks
Permian sharks
Triassic sharks
Mississippian first appearances
Mississippian taxonomic orders
Pennsylvanian taxonomic orders
Cisuralian taxonomic orders
Guadalupian taxonomic orders
Lopingian taxonomic orders
Early Triassic taxonomic orders
Middle Triassic taxonomic orders
Middle Triassic extinctions